The 1992–93 Football League Trophy, known as the 1992–93 Autoglass Trophy for sponsorship reasons, was the 10th staging of the Football League Trophy, a knock-out competition for English football clubs in the Second and Third Divisions (now known as League One and Two).

The winners were Port Vale, who defeated Stockport County 2–1 in the final.

The competition began on 1 December 1992 and ended with the final on 22 May 1993.

The tournament begins with clubs divided into a Northern and a Southern section, and teams entering a group stage. Each section then gradually eliminates the qualifying teams in knock-out fashion until each has a winning finalist. At this point, the two winning finalists face each other in the combined final for the honour of the trophy.

First round

Northern Section
Burnley and Darlington received byes.

Southern Section
Port Vale and Swansea City received byes.

Second round

Northern Section

Southern Section

Area quarter-finals

Northern Section

Southern Section

Area semi-finals

Northern Section

Southern Section

Area finals

Northern Area final

Southern Area final

Final

Notes

External links
Official website
Video footage of the Final at Stockport County's official site

EFL Trophy
Tro
1992–93 domestic association football cups